Barber Green is a village in Cumbria, England.

Villages in Cumbria
Staveley-in-Cartmel